Leccinum arctostaphyli is a species of bolete fungus in the family Boletaceae. Found in northwestern North America, including Alaska and British Columbia, it was described as new to science in 1967.

See also
List of Leccinum species
List of North American boletes

References

Fungi described in 1967
Fungi of Canada
Fungi of the United States
arctostaphyli
Fungi without expected TNC conservation status